There are at least 8 named mountains in Toole County, Montana.
 Black Butte, el. 
 Gold Butte, el. 
 Grassy Butte, el. 
 Jackass Butte, el. 
 Jerusalem Rocks, el. 
 Middle Butte, el. 
 Raglan Butte, el. 
 West Butte, el.

See also
 List of mountains in Montana
 List of mountain ranges in Montana

Notes

Landforms of Toole County, Montana
Toole